Albert Jerome Wheeler (April 7, 1895 – January 18, 1968) was an American comedian who performed in Broadway theatre, American comedy feature films, and vaudeville acts. He was the comedy partner of Robert Woolsey, and together they formed a successful double act called Wheeler & Woolsey.

Biography 
Wheeler was born in Paterson, New Jersey on April 7, 1895.

He worked with Robert Woolsey on Broadway until their film debut in 1929, Rio Rita, established them in the Hollywood film industry.

In the early 1940s, after Robert Woolsey had died, Bert Wheeler struggled to restart his career. Their friend and former film costar Dorothy Lee agreed to tour with him in a vaudeville act. He also worked on radio on programs starring Frank Sinatra.

He continued to work off and on through the 1960s. In 1950 he appeared with Jackie Gleason on the early TV variety hour Cavalcade of Stars. His last theatrical films were two slapstick short films for Columbia Pictures, filmed in 1950 and produced by Jules White. He also kept up a busy schedule of live performances in nightclubs and on the legitimate stage, in such plays as Harvey (in the leading role of Elwood P. Dowd) and Three Wishes for Jamie. In 1955 Wheeler co-starred with Keith Larsen in the CBS western series Brave Eagle; Wheeler played the "half-breed" Smokey Joe, known for his tall tales and tribal wisdom.

Bert Wheeler died of emphysema in New York City on January 18, 1968. He had been a member of The Lambs Club since 1927.

Filmography
(As per the AFI database)

Marriages 
Wheeler was married five times. His only child, with Speer, was Patricia Anne Wheeler.
 Margaret Grae (m. 27 April 1915 to 15 November 1926) divorced.
 Bernice Speer (m. 15 April 1928 to 19 February 1936) divorced, they had 1 child.
 Sally Haines (m. 26 February 1937 to 1939) divorced.
 Patsy Orr (c1940 to c1950) divorced.
 Olga Desmondae Rieman (m. 1951 - 8 August 1966) to her death.

Home video releases 
Nine of Wheeler's 21 movies were released in a DVD collection entitled "Wheeler & Woolsey: RKO Comedy Classics Collection" in March 2013 by Warner Archive.

References

External links 

 
 

1895 births
1968 deaths
American male film actors
Deaths from emphysema
Actors from Paterson, New Jersey
Vaudeville performers
20th-century American male actors